Thikriwala 74 Jb is a village in Punjab, Pakistan. It is situated at the Jhang road, 22 km from Faisalabad city, in Tehsil Sadar.

Famous people 
 Rana Muhammad Akram Khan, Chairman Punjab Bar Council.

Villages in Faisalabad District